Frederick M. Nicholas (born May 30, 1920) is an American lawyer specializing in real estate development and leases. He is known as "Mr. Downtown Culture" for his role in building the Museum of Contemporary Art, Los Angeles, the Geffen Contemporary, the Walt Disney Concert Hall, and for the founding of Public Counsel, the nation's largest public interest law firm. Frederick M. Nicholas has combined his legal career with a heavy real estate involvement to become an institution builder in the arts in Los Angeles.

Biography
Frederick M. Nicholas, an attorney licensed to practice law in the State of California since 1952, is a specialist in Real Estate Development and Leases. He is President of The Hapsmith Company, a Real Estate Development Firm with major interests in Northern and Southern California.

 Private Law Practice 1962 - 1980
 Law Firm of Swerdlow, Glikbarg & Nicholas 1956 - 1962
 Law Firm of Loeb & Loeb 1952 - 1956
 University of Southern California Law School J.D. Degree - 1952
 University of Chicago Law School 1950 - 1951
 United Press International Labor Correspondent, Honolulu 1947 - 1949
 University of Southern California A.B. in Journalism - Graduated in 1947
 United States Army Served October 1941 - November 1946 Rose to rank of Captain

Personal life
Fred Nicholas was born May 30, 1920 in Brooklyn, New York. His father was Ben Nicholas who was the first member of his family born in the United States. Ben was a laundry supply salesman and worked for Washine National Sands. His mother was Rose Nechols, a distant cousin of Ben. They were married June 15, 1919 in the Bronx, New York.
Fred grew up in Brooklyn, New York and Cedarhurst, Long Island. The Nicholas family migrated to Los Angeles in 1934 where Fred attended John Burroughs Junior High, graduating in 1935; Los Angeles High School, graduating in 1938; and USC, graduating in 1947. He married Eleanore Berman, Sept. 2, 1951 (divorced 1963). Children: Deborah, Jan, Tony. Married Joan Fields, Jan. 2, 1983. Joan had three daughters of her own, Rebecca, Joanna, and Judith. He currently lives in Beverly Hills, California.

Wartime
Fred Nicholas was drafted into the US Army on October 9, 1941, while he was in his senior year at USC School of Journalism at the age of 21.

He was assigned to Camp Roberts for infantry training, which was interrupted by the declaration of war on December 7, 1941. He was then assigned to a Military Police unit stationed in San Francisco which was ordered to round up and imprison people of Japanese descent in a relocation camp located at Tanforan Race Track in San Bruno, California. Fred was a guard at the relocation camp for four months and celebrated his 22nd birthday on guard duty.

Nicholas attended officers training camp at Fort Oglethorpe, Georgia and was promoted to the rank of Second Lieutenant on October 9, 1942, one year from the date he was drafted into the Army.

Nicholas spent more than two and a half years overseas, serving in North Africa, Sicily, Italy, Southern France and the Philippines. He rose to the rank of captain and served as a platoon leader and company commander until his discharge in February 1946. He was awarded the Bronze Star Medal and Purple Heart.

Journalism
Nicholas graduated from the USC School of Journalism in the winter of 1947, and was hired by United Press as a reporter in Hawaii during 1948 and 1949.

He worked in Honolulu at the Honolulu Advertiser Building under the aegis of the Twigg-Smith Family, publishers of The Honolulu Advertiser. He became a labor reporter at a time when the transportation to and from Hawaii was shut down by a longshoremen's strike under the leadership of Harry Bridges. Nicholas covered Bridges and Gus Hall, Chairman of the Communist Party in Honolulu during the strike. He left for law school in Chicago in 1950.

Sports
Fred Nicholas started playing handball when he was nine years old at Brighton Beach, New York. He played handball through Junior High, High School, University and Law School. He won Los Angeles City High School Championship; the USC Championship; and the NCAA Championship during his playing years.

Arts
Fred Nicholas became engaged in the pursuit of art in 1950 when he was a law student at the University of Chicago. What little spare time he had was spent at the Chicago Art Institute exploring the art of old and new cultures. Upon graduating from Law School, Nicholas took art courses at UCLA and USC.

During his legal career, Nicholas represented numerous artists and art galleries including William Brice, Paul Kantor Gallery, Ernest Raboff Gallery, Margo Leavin Gallery, Frank Perls Gallery, Martin Lowitz Gallery, ACE Gallery, Harry Franklin Gallery and Felix Landau Gallery.

Nicholas began collecting art in the 1950s and purchased contemporary and primitive art from dealers and auction houses throughout the country. He collected Rauschenberg, Warhol, Stella, Lichtenstein, Reinhardt and many of the New York School artists as well as Pre-Columbian, African, New Guinea and American Indian Art.

His interest in art brought him to various institutions in the art field. Nicholas served the Museum of Contemporary Art Los Angeles as Chairman for Five years, Vice Chairman for 4 years and serves as a Life Trustee. He was a Trustee of Art Center College of Design in Pasadena, now a Life Trustee; the Frederick R. Weisman Art Foundation, and Frederick R. Weisman Philanthropic Foundation.

He was the principal advisor to the San Francisco Museum of Modern Art and the Santa Monica Museum. He located the site for MOCA's Temporary Contemporary (now The Geffen Contemporary at MOCA) and negotiated a 99-year lease with the City of Los Angeles and MOCA. Nicholas hired Frank Gehry as architect and supervised the design and construction of the building. He headed the architectural committee for the development of the MOCA building on Grand Avenue, supervised architect Arata Isozaki and was in charge of the construction project for 5 years.

Nicholas served as the first Chairman of the Walt Disney Concert Hall Committee, guiding the development of the building. He created the program and architectural infrastructure for the Concert Hall including the selection of the architect, Frank Gehry and the acoustician, Nagata & Associates. He served as chairman for 8 years.

Museum of Contemporary Art
In 1980, Fred Nicholas was asked by his friend Max Palevsky, to help him with the various architectural difficulties he was having with the Museum of Contemporary Art, Los Angeles. Palevsky had pledged $1,000,000 to MOCA with the understanding that he would head the Architectural Committee. Palevsky hired renowned Japanese architect Arata Isozaki but was unhappy with Isozaki's design. Palevsky felt Nicholas could resolve the myriad of issues pertaining to MOCA because Nicholas was an attorney and a real estate developer with broad experience in design and construction.

One of the pre-eminent issues concerning the design plan was Isozaki's lack of experience working in the United States. Nicholas hired Gruen Associates of Los Angeles, to aid Isozaki in perfecting his design. Palevsky disapproved the final design plan and hired another architect to redesign the building. A dispute arose, and the Board of Trustees voted to approve the Isozaki design. Palevsky resigned from the Museum Board and filed suit to recover his pledge to MOCA. The litigation was settled and Nicholas took over the Chairmanship of the Architectural Committee. He supervised Isozaki and was in charge of the development and construction of MOCA for five years.

Nicholas negotiated the lease between the City of Los Angeles and the Museum on the Grand Avenue site as well as the site for the Temporary Contemporary (TC). On behalf of the Museum, he hired architect Frank Gehry to design the TC. Nicholas supervised the entire construction project. The Temporary Contemporary (now the Geffen Contemporary) is widely regarded as one of the most important museum designs of the late 20th Century.

With the goal of building a permanent collection for the fledgling museum, Nicholas, along with Museum Director Richard Koshalek and Chairman Eli Broad, negotiated with Count Giuseppe Panza of Varese to acquire the Panza Collection for MOCA. The Collection, which includes seminal works by Jasper Johns, Robert Rauschenberg, Mark Rothko, Franz Kline and James Rosenquist, is considered one of the world's great private collections of contemporary art and forms the core of MOCA's permanent collection.

Nicholas served as Vice Chairman of MOCA for 4 years and as Chairman for 5 years. He is now a Life Trustee of MOCA.

Sam Francis estate
Sam Francis, a celebrated California color field artist, died November 4, 1994, and left a myriad of legal entanglements that lasted almost 5 years.

Francis' original attorney was removed by the Superior Court and Nicholas was named Administrator With Will Annexed of the Estate in 1996.

Nicholas negotiated for 2 years with family members and their attorneys before a Global Settlement was reached in 1998 and the claims of all parties were settled.

The assets of the estate were divided equally among his heirs and the balance of his art inventory was transferred to the Sam Francis Museum, a foundation dedicated to the preservation of the artwork and legacy of Sam Francis.

During his tenure as administrator of Sam Francis' Estate, Nicholas arranged a comprehensive one-man show of Francis' art at MOCA. The show traveled to the Reina Sofia in Madrid; Museum of Modern Art in Rome; and the Contemporary Museum of Stockholm. He placed Francis' work in numerous gallery shows throughout the United States, including Ace Gallery, Beverly Hills; Gagosian Gallery, New York; Gallery Delaive, Amsterdam; Art in Embassies Program, US State Department; Greenberg Van Doren Gallery, New York; Manny Silverman Gallery, Los Angeles; André Emmerich Gallery, New York; Gemini Gel, Los Angeles; Baukust Galerie, Cologne; Thomas Segal Gallery, Baltimore; Alan Christea Gallery, London; Gallerie Jean Fournier, Paris; Galerie Pro Arta, Zurich; Galerie Kornfeld, Bern; Richard Gray Gallery, Chicago; Jonathan Novak Gallery, Los Angeles; Bobbie Greenfield Gallery, Los Angeles; Leslie Sacks Fine Arts, Los Angeles; Long Fine Arts, New York; Gallery Maurice, Massachusetts.

Walt Disney Concert Hall

In the late 1980s, Mrs. Walt Disney gave the Music Center of Los Angeles, a gift of $50,000,000 to build a Concert Hall honoring her husband Walt Disney in Downtown, Los Angeles.

In 1987, Dan Frost, Chairman of the Music Center chose Frederick M. Nicholas to head the Walt Disney Concert Hall Committee and undertake the development of a concert hall at 1st and Grand Avenue in Los Angeles.

Nicholas at the time was the newly elected Chairman of the Museum of Contemporary Art and accepted the new position only after assurances from Mrs. Disney that she wanted a world-class design with great acoustics.

Nicholas and his staff planned the program for the construction of Disney Hall, chose the architect and acoustician and guided the design. He spent 8 years on the project pro-bono.

Art Center College of Design

Fred Nicholas has been trustee of Art Center College of Design for approximately 9 years, having joined the Board at the request of Richard Koshalek, his longtime friend and former Director of the Museum of Contemporary Art where Nicholas serves as a Life Trustee.

Nicholas' role at Art Center has been to help develop the recently completed downtown campus and to negotiate with the City of Pasadena for a long- term lease on the City's neighboring Power Plant. In addition Nicholas is aiding in the development of Student Housing for the downtown campus.

Professional
The professional career of Fred Nicholas spans over 6 decades commencing in 1952 when he was admitted to the California Bar Association.

Nicholas practiced Real Estate Law for more than 50 years. During that time he became involved in a myriad of related activities including his founding of Public Counsel, the largest pro-bono law firm in the world; representing Synanon, a self-help organization of former drug addicts; developing numerous shopping centers and office tower complexes in Washington, D.C. and Los Angeles; and activism in National and Statewide Democratic Politics.

Law
In 1952, Fred Nicholas was sworn in as a lawyer in California, and started his legal career at Loeb & Loeb in Los Angeles. He practiced law with Loeb & Loeb for  years, and left to form a law firm with Harry Swerdlow and William Glikbarg. The firm, called Swerdlow, Glikbarg & Nicholas, specialized in contract and antitrust law. Nicholas remained at SG&N for 6 years, and then formed his own law firm specializing in real estate law. He remained an active attorney until 1980 when he became a full-time real estate developer. Nicholas still retains his license to practice law in California.

Public Counsel
In 1968, Fred Nicholas was named by the president of the Beverly Hills Bar Association, Chairman of a Committee on the Future of the Bar. It was at this time that Ralph Nader was a guest speaker at a Beverly Hills Bar Association lunch and spoke about the responsibilities of lawyers to the community. He criticized the legal profession for “Not Giving Back”.

This message hit a nerve with Nicholas and he suggested to members of his Committee that the Beverly Hills Bar Association sponsor a pro-bono law firm to provide free legal services to the poor and needy. After two years of debate, the Beverly Hills Bar Association in 1970 authorized the formation of a pro-bono law firm under the name of Beverly Hills Bar Association Law Foundation. The Bar donated $5000 to its formation and Fred Nicholas was the first president with a staff of Stanley Levy as the first director and Ann Dominique Snyder as assistant. The fledgling organization survived on a donation of $20,000 from Nicholas and small gifts from the large Beverly Hills law firms.

After the birth of the Beverly Hills Bar Association Law Foundation, the most important event in its history was the joining in 1975 of the Los Angeles County Bar Association in co-sponsoring the foundation and the changing of its name to Public Counsel.

Today Public Counsel is the largest pro-bono law organization in the World, helping more than 25,000 individuals and entities each year. The value of its yearly services is more than $45 million.

Nicholas was awarded the Founders Award in 1990 by Public Counsel, and the Lloyd C. Cutler Lifetime Achievement Award from the Lawyers' Committee for Civil Rights Under Law in 2008.

Synanon
Synanon was a self-help society formed by ex-dope addicts, ex-criminals and ex-prostitutes in 1959 and led by an ex-alcoholic named Charles Dederich. Fred Nicholas became Dederich's and Synanon's pro-bono lawyer in 1960 through Jack Roberts, a dear friend of Nicholas.

Nicholas represented Synanon in a myriad of legal problems from zoning violations, litigation and real estate acquisitions for a period of 8 years including the Synanon acquisition of the Del Mar Beach Club in Santa Monica and the Synanon ranch in Tomales Bay.

Dederich referred to Nicholas as his " Battery of Attorneys".

Nicholas severed his relationship with Synanon when the organization became militant in 1968.

Three books have been written about Synanon and Nicholas' role with the Organization, "The Tunnel Back: Synanon" by Lewis Yablonsky (1964);"Synanon" by Guy Endore (1968).; From Miracle to Madness: True Story of Charles Dederich and Synanon (2015) https://www.amazon.com/Miracle-Madness-2nd-Charles-Dederich/dp/0578163055/ref=sr_1_2?s=books&ie=UTF8&qid=1508722156&sr=1-2&keywords=synanon

Real estate

Fred Nicholas started in the real estate business in 1956 when he met Maurice O. Smith (Hap Smith) a real estate broker who was involved in minor real estate transactions in the west side of Los Angeles.

Hap Smith was referred to Nicholas as a real estate attorney at Loeb & Loeb. He needed a lawyer to prepare an option agreement for real property in Fremont, California. Hap Smith was unable to pay for the legal work and as a result Loeb & Loeb refused to accept him as a client.

Nicholas and Hap Smith became immediate friends and Nicholas prepared the option agreement on his free time without charge. Smith also was unable to raise the down payment for the option agreement and Nicholas raised the funds among his family and friends. Hap Smith invited Nicholas to become his partner and they formed a partnership known as The Hapsmith Company in 1956 because Nicholas was practicing law and did not want his name on the partnership.

The Hapsmith Company's first project was the development of a community shopping center in Fremont California with the second Mervyns store ever built as the one anchor tenant and Sears as the other. The Center was a success and expanded into phase II. After many years of operation, the Center was exchanged for a 50% interest in a twin AMFAC tower office complex in downtown Honolulu, which The Hapsmith Company owned and operated for more than 10 years.

Other real estate projects followed in rapid order; Eastridge Shopping Center in San Jose; Tanforan Park in San Bruno, CA; Montebello Mart, CA; Brea-Imperial Shopping Center, Brea, CA; Norwood Shopping Center in Sacramento, CA; Union Bank Center, Los Angeles, CA; Weberstown Shopping Center in Stockton, CA; Stimson Business Center, Los Angeles, CA; Wilshire Rexford Building, Beverly Hills, CA; The SuperMall of the Great Northwest in Auburn, WA; the Ronald Reagan Building in Washington D.C. and the Culver Center, in Culver City, CA.

Hap Smith died in 1975, and Nicholas formed a corporation called The Hapsmith Company and continued to develop and own shopping centers, which the company has done since 1956.

Awards

Involvements
EXECUTIVE COMMITTEE OF THE LAWYERS' COMMITTEE FOR CIVIL RIGHTS UNDER LAW, Washington D.C. - Member

FUND FOR THE REPUBLIC AND THE CENTER FOR THE STUDY OF DEMOCRATIC INSTITUTIONS - Trustee

PITZER COLLEGE (Claremont) - Trustee

ACLU FOUNDATION - Director

LOS ANGELES MUSEUM OF CONTEMPORARY ART - Former Chairman of the Board of Trustees

LOS ANGELES TASK FORCE ON ART - Member

SPECIAL ADMINISTRATOR TO THE ESTATE OF SAM FRANCIS

FREDERICK R. WEISMAN ART FOUNDATION - Trustee

FREDERICK R. WEISMAN PHILANTHROPIC FOUNDATION - Trustee

WALT DISNEY CONCERT HALL COMMITTEE of The Music Center - Chairman (to 1996)

THE MUSIC CENTER of Los Angeles County - Governor (to 1996)

DANCE GALLERY, Los Angeles - Trustee (to 1994)

CIVIC CENTER REVIEW COMMITTEE for the City of Beverly Hills - Member (to 1995)

GREYSTONE FOUNDATION for the City of Beverly Hills - Former Chairman

CALIFORNIA ECONOMIC DEVELOPMENT COMMISSION - Member

THE CALIFORNIA COUNCIL ON TECHNOLOGY EDUCATION - Previous Member

THE CALIFORNIA BUSINESS PROPERTIES ASSOCIATION - Previous Member Board of Directors

COMMITTEE ON THE CALIFORNIA JUDICIAL SYSTEM - Los Angeles County Bar Association - Member ’83-'84

AMERICAN FEDERATION OF THE ARTS - Trustee

AMERICAN ARTS ALLIANCE - Trustee

LOS ANGELES PHILHARMONIC ASSOCIATION - Trustee (to 1996)

ART CENTER COLLEGE OF DESIGN - Trustee and  Life Trustee

WALLIS ANNENBERG CENTER FOR THE PERFORMING ARTS - Trustee

Accomplishments
Active in many organizations involved in the needs and interests of the community:

 FOUNDER and FIRST PRESIDENT of Public Counsel, a Public Interest Law Firm of the Los Angeles County Bar Association and Beverly Hills Bar Association. Served also as Director and Treasurer.
 CHAIRMAN of the Shopping Center Subsection of the Real Property Section of the Beverly Hills and Los Angeles County Bar Associations
 PRESIDENT of The Maple Center - the Beverly Hills Community Counseling Center 1979-'97; and Member of the Board of Directors from 1975-'82
 COMMISSIONER of the California Broadcasting Commission from 1976-'84; and its FIRST CHAIRMAN 1976-'78
 GENERAL COUNSEL for the Beverly Hills Board of Realtors from 1971 through 1979
 BOARD OF GOVERNORS of the Beverly Hills Bar Association - served two terms: 1970-'72 and 1975-'77

Author of numerous articles and publications on real estate law which include:

 "COMMERCIAL REAL PROPERTY LEASE PRACTICE" published by the University of California Continuing Education of the Bar (1976): Co-author of a Two Volume Treatise
 "CALIFORNIA LAND SECURITY AND DEVELOPMENT" published by the University of California Continuing Education of the Bar (1960): Chapter: "Setting Up A Shopping Center"

Honors
  "ALBERT NELSON MARQUIS LIFETIME ACHIEVEMENT AWARD" by Marquis Who's Who, July 25, 2019
 "FREDERICK M. AND JOAN NICHOLAS LIFETIME ACHIEVEMENT AWARD" Hillcrest Country Club - 2014
 "FREDERICK M. NICHOLAS GARDEN OF HOPE' Public Counsel - 2010
 "LOUIS B. FOX AWARD" Beverly Hills Bar Association - 2008
 "LLOYD N. CUTLER LIFETIME ACHIEVEMENT AWARD” Lawyers' Committee for Civil Rights Under Law, Washington D.C. - 2008
 Listed in "WHO'S WHO IN AMERICA, WHO'S WHO IN WORLD, WHO'S WHO IN AMERICAN LAW” - 2014
 "AFFILIATE OF THE YEAR" American Institute of Architects - 2006
 "L. A. COMMUNITY SERVICE AWARD" American Institute of Architects - 2006
 "AFFILIATE OF THE YEAR" ACLU Foundation - 2005
 "EQUAL JUSTICE ADVOCACY AWARD" ACLU Foundation - 2005
 "PARKINSON SPIRIT OF URBANISM AWARD" University of Southern California Architectural Guild - 2004
 "AFFILIATE OF THE YEAR" University of Southern California Architectural Guild – 2004.
 "DISTINGUISHED SERVICE AWARD CLASS OF '52" University of Southern California - 2002
 "CITY OF ANGELS AWARD" Central City Association of Los Angeles - 1994
 "TRIBUTE AWARD" Los Angeles County Music Center - 1993
 "UCLA DEAN'S COUNCIL AWARD" UCLA Graduate School of Architecture - 1993
 "TRUSTEES' AWARD" California Institute of the Arts - 1993
 "FOUNDERS AWARD" Public Counsel - 1990
 "OUTSTANDING FOUNDER IN PHILANTHROPY AWARD" National Philanthropy Day Committee - 1990
 "CORO FOUNDATION AWARD" Public Service - 1988
 "THE MEDICI AWARD" for The Hapsmith Company Los Angeles Chamber of Commerce - 1987
 "EXCEPTIONAL SERVICE AWARD" Beverly Hills Bar Association in 1986 and 2004
 "CITIZEN OF THE YEAR" Beverly Hills Chamber of Commerce and Civic Association- 1983
 "HONORARY AFFILIATE MEMBER FOR LIFE AWARD" Beverly Hills Board of Realtors - 1980
 "CITIZEN OF THE YEAR" Beverly Hills Board of Realtors - 1978
 "DISTINGUISHED SERVICE AWARD" Beverly Hills Bar Association in 1974 and 1981
 "AFFILIATE OF THE YEAR" Beverly Hills Board of Realtors in 1971 and 1974.
 "THE MEDICI AWARD" Los Angeles Chamber of Commerce -1970 for "Outstanding Individual Commitment to the Arts in Los Angeles and the Nation"

References

External links
The Frederick M. Nicholas Archive

20th-century American lawyers
Living people
1920 births
American centenarians
American real estate businesspeople
United States Army personnel of World War II
United States Army officers
University of Southern California alumni